Acacia consobrina is a shrub of the genus Acacia and the subgenus Plurinerves that is endemic to south western Australia.

Description
It has hairy branchlets with patent or appressed hairs that are often a golden colour on young growth. Like most species of Acacia it has phyllodes rather than true leaves. It blooms from May to September and produces yellow flowers.

Taxonomy
The species was first formally described by the botanists Richard Sumner Cowan and Bruce Maslin in 1990 as part of the work Acacia Miscellany. Some oligoneurous species of Acacia (Leguminosae: Mimosoideae: Section Plurinerves) from Western Australia as published in the work Nuytsia. It was reclassified as Racosperma consobrinum in 2003 by Leslie Pedley then transferred back genus Acacia in 2006. The name can be misapplied to Acacia ixiophylla which resembles. The shrub belongs to the Acacia flavipila group and is closely related to that species, it is superficially similar to Acacia caesariata and Acacia verricula.

Distribution
It is native to an area in Wheatbelt and Great Southern regions of Western Australia where it is commonly situated on undulating sandplains and colluvial flats growing in sandy-clay, loamy-clay or clay soils. Although common in the areas it is found it has a scattered distribution from around Karlgarin in the north down to around Gnowangerup in the south west and near Jerramungup in the south east where it is usually a part of low Eucalyptus woodland or open shrub mallee communities.

See also
List of Acacia species

References

consobrina
Acacias of Western Australia
Taxa named by Bruce Maslin
Plants described in 1990